Brockett is a surname, and may refer to:

 Chloe Brockett, English television personality
 Don Brockett, American actor, comedian, producer and director
 Jamie Brockett, New England-based folk singer
 John Brockett (disambiguation), multiple people
 John Trotter Brockett (1788–1842), British attorney, antiquarian, numismatist, and philologist
 Lawrence Brockett (1724–1768), Regius Professor of Modern History at Cambridge University
 Roger W. Brockett, professor of computer science, founded the Harvard Robotics Laboratory in 1983

See also
 Brocket (disambiguation)
 Brackett (disambiguation)